The Victorian Ranger Association (VRA) was established in the early 1980s to represent Park Rangers and their professional interests in the management of natural and cultural assets in the state of Victoria, Australia.

When Parks Victoria formed in 1996, the VRA changed its focus to represent all rangers of the previous (amalgamated) organisations rather than just the previous National Park Service rangers.

Today the VRA represents all individuals who work in a field delivery role for Victorian organizations that have natural and cultural resource conservation as their main focus.

The VRA is an active member of both the Australian Ranger Federation (ARF) and the International Ranger Federation (IRF). VRA members automatically are members of both these bodies.

Purpose
The objectives for which the Association was established include:
representing members professional interests as a valued contributors to the management of natural and cultural assets
to provide networking opportunities with fellow professionals in the area of natural and cultural resource management
to represent the voice and opinions of members working in the field

Affiliated organisations
International Ranger Federation
Australian Ranger Federation
Queensland Ranger Association

External links
International Ranger Federation
Australian Ranger Federation
Victorian Ranger Association

Organisations based in Victoria (Australia)
Professional associations based in Australia
Environment of Victoria (Australia)
Nature conservation organisations based in Australia